Step Up is an American romantic-dance anthology franchise. Based on characters created by Duane Adler, the franchise includes six films and a television series. The films have received a generally mixed critical reception, while being a box office success with a collective total of $651 million.

Films

Step Up (2006)

Tyler Gage (Channing Tatum) receives the opportunity of a lifetime after vandalizing a performing arts school, gaining him the chance to earn a scholarship and dance with an up-and-coming dancer, Nora Clark (Jenna Dewan).

Step Up 2: The Streets (2008)

Romantic sparks occur between two dance students (Andie and Chase) from very different backgrounds at the Maryland School of the Arts.

Step Up 3D (2010)

A tight-knit group of New York City street dancers find themselves pitted against the world's best hip hop dancers in a high-stakes showdown.

Step Up Revolution (2012)

A group of flash mob dancers led by Sean (Ryan Guzman) and the daughter of a hotel tycoon, Emily (Kathryn McCormick), attempt to save a Miami strip populated by a tight-knit community from being developed into hotels.

Step Up: All In (2014)

All-stars from the previous Step Up installments come together in glittering Las Vegas battling for a victory that could define their dreams and their careers.

Step Up: Year of the Dance (2020)
Step Up: Year of the Dance is a 2020 Chinese produced and marketed film directed by Ron Yuan. Youth from different social classes in Beijing come together to form China's best dance crew and learn what it really means to be family. It was released in theaters internationally on June 26, 2019, and in the U.S. on digitally on January 21, 2020.

Television

Step Up: High Water (2018-present)

A television series is based on the film series simply titled  Step Up: High Water was released on January 31, 2018 on YouTube Red. YouTube renewed the series for a second season in May 2018, premiering on March 20, 2019.

The series was cancelled after two seasons in August 2019, but in May 2020, the series was announced to have been renewed and picked up for third season on Starz. It is also renamed as Step Up in this season. It would premiere in October 2022, before being cancelled again shortly before the finale in December.

Principal cast

Additional crew and production details

Reception

Box office

Critical and public response

In other media
 Exercise releases
Officially licensed workout routine videos were produced for straight-to-home video media:
 Step Up Revolution Dance Workout which was released on December 4, 2012.
 Step Up Revolution: Hip-Hop Cardio Burn which was released on December 3, 2013.

 Live stage show 
 Step Up: Dubai, All In! debuted in 2016 at the Motiongate Dubai.

See also

 The Legion of Extraordinary Dancers

References

External links
 Step Up Franchise The-Numbers.com

English-language films
Film franchises introduced in 2006
Films adapted into television shows
Lionsgate films
Lionsgate franchises
Step Up (film series)
Summit Entertainment films
Walt Disney Studios (division) franchises